Miki Liukkonen (born 8 July 1989 in Oulu) is a Finnish writer, poet and a musician. He has released four novels and three poetry books. His 2017 novel O was nominated for a Finlandia Prize. Liukkonen has played guitar in an alternative rock band The Scenes, and is a host of a television talk show Miki Liukkonen, sivullinen.

Personal life
Liukkonen was born in Oulu, but has since moved to Helsinki. He has openly discussed his addiction to alcohol, which led to him becoming a teetotaller in 2020. Liukkonen is in a relationship with singer and songwriter Behm.

Selected bibliography

Novels 
Lapset auringon alla (2013)
O (2017)
Hiljaisuuden mestari (2019)
Elämä: esipuhe (2021)

Poetry books 
Valkoisia runoja (2011)
Elisabet (2012)
Raivon historia (2015)

References

Finnish writers
1989 births
Living people
People from Oulu